Pandit Jasraj (28 January 1930  – 17 August 2020) was an Indian classical vocalist, belonging to the Mewati gharana (musical apprenticeship lineage). His musical career spanned 75 years resulting in national and international fame, respect and numerous major awards and accolades. His legacy includes memorable performances of classical and semi-classical vocal music, classical and devotional music, albums and film soundtracks, innovations in various genres including Haveli Sangeeth and popularizing the Mewati Gharana - a school of thought in Hindustani classical music. Pandit Jasraj taught music to amateur and professional students in India, Europe, Canada and the United States.

Early life 
Jasraj was born on 28 January 1930 in Pili Mandori, a village in the then Hisar district (now in Fatehabad district) of Haryana, in a middle-class Brahmin family to Pandit Motiram, a classical singer and Krishna Bai. He was the youngest of three sons, in a family of classical singers. Motiram died in 1934 when Jasraj was four, on the day he was to be appointed as the state musician in the court of Mir Osman Ali Khan. His eldest brother was vocalist Pandit Maniram, who instructed Jasraj after the death of their father. Jasraj's elder brother, Pandit Pratap Narayan, was also an accomplished musician and was the father of music composer duo Jatin–Lalit, singer-actress Sulakshana Pandit and actress Vijeta Pandit. Pandit Pratap Narayan taught Jasraj to play tabla starting at age 7, but Jasraj decided that he wanted to only sing by 14.

Jasraj spent his youth in Hyderabad, and travelled often to Sanand in Gujarat to study music with musicians of the Mewati gharana. Jasraj performed for Maharaj Jaywant Singh Waghela, the Thakur Sahib of Sanand, who was deeply dedicated to classical music, and received training from him.

In 1946, Jasraj moved to Calcutta, where he began singing classical music for radio.

Personal life 

In 1962, Jasraj married Madhura Shantaram, the daughter of film director V. Shantaram, whom he had first met in 1960 in Bombay. They initially lived in Calcutta, moving to Bombay in 1963. They had two children, a son, Shaarang Dev Pandit, a daughter, Durga Jasraj, and three grandchildren.

Madhura made a film, Sangeet Martand Pandit Jasraj in 2009 and directed her first Marathi film, Aai Tuza Ashirwad, in 2010, in which her husband and Lata Mangeshkar sang in Marathi.

Career

Training 
Jasraj was initiated into vocal music by his father, and later trained as a tabla accompanist under his elder brother, Pandit Pratap Narayan. He would frequently accompany Maniram in his solo vocal performances. He credits the vocalist, Begum Akhtar, as inspiring him to take up classical music.

Jasraj began training as a vocalist at the age of 14, after renouncing tabla in reaction to how accompanists were treated at the time . He would practice singing close to 14 hours a day. In 1952 when he was 22 he performed his first stage concert as a vocalist in the court of King Tribhuvan Bir Bikram Shah of Nepal in Kathmandu. Before becoming a stage performer, Jasraj worked as a performing artist on radio for several years.

He initially trained as a classical vocalist with Pandit Maniram, and later with Jaiwant Singh Waghela, a vocalist and beenkar, and Gulam Qadir Khan of Mewati gharana. In addition, he trained under Swami Vallabhdas Damulji of the Agra gharana.

Technique and style

Classical music 
Musicologist S. Kalidas has noted, however, that this borrowing of elements across gharanas has now become more commonly accepted.

He was also known for presenting a variety of rare ragas including Abiri Todi and Patdeepaki.

Semi-classical and popular music 
In addition to performing classical music, Jasraj had worked to popularise innovations in semi-classical musical styles, such as Haveli Sangeet, which involves semi-classical performances in temples. He had also sung classical and semi-classical compositions for film soundtracks, such as the song, 'Vandana Karo', composed in the raga Ahir Bhairav by the composer Vasant Desai, for the film Ladki Sahyadri Ki (1966), a duet with vocalist Bhimsen Joshi for the soundtrack of the film Birbal My Brother (1975), and a ballad, Vaada Tumse Hai Vaada for a horror film titled 1920 (2008) directed by Vikram Bhatt.

In memory of his father, Jasraj organised an annual musical festival called the Pandit Motiram Pandit Maniram Sangeet Samaroh in Hyderabad. The festival has been held annually since 1972.

On 28 January 2017, the production house Navrasa Duende celebrated Jasraj's 87th birthday and 80 years of his service to music with a classical music concert titled My Journey, an Intimate Evening with Pandit Jasraj at Jawaharlal Nehru Stadium, New Delhi. He received a standing ovation.

Teaching 

Jasraj tutored several students who have gone on to perform as classical musicians, including Saptarshi Chakraborty, Sanjeev Abhyankar, violinist Kala Ramnath, Sandeep Ranade, shehnai player Lokesh Anand, Tripti Mukherjee, Suman Ghosh, flautist Shashank Subramanyam,  Anuradha Paudwal, Sadhana Sargam,  and Ramesh Narayan.

He was also the founder of schools for Indian classical music in Atlanta, Tampa, Vancouver, Toronto, New York, New Jersey, Pittsburgh, Mumbai, and Kerala. Jasraj would spend six months of each year in the United States and Canada at either his home in New Jersey, teaching, or touring. At age 90, he was teaching some of his international students through Skype.

Death 
Pandit Jasraj remained in the US when the country entered its COVID-19 lockdown. He died at his home in New Jersey on 17 August 2020 at 5:15 am EST, due to cardiac arrest. His body was later repatriated on an Air India flight to Mumbai where it was cremated with state honours and 21-gun salute at Pawan Hans Crematorium in Vile Parle. The Prime Minister of India, Narendra Modi said that his death "leaves a deep void in the Indian cultural sphere. Not only were his renditions outstanding, he also made a mark as an exceptional mentor to several other vocalists."

Awards and honours

Discography

Performances in film soundtracks 
 "Vandana Karo" in Ladki Sahyadri Ki (1966, music by Vasant Desai, based on Ahir Bhairav)
 Jugalbandi with Bhimsen Joshi in Birbal My Brother (1973, music by Shyam Prabhakar, based on Malkauns)
 "Neend Na Aaye" in Ek Hasina Thi (2004, music by Amar Mohile)
 "Vaada Tumse Hai Vaada" in 1920 (2008, music by Adnan Sami)
 A song in Life of Pi (2012, music by Mychael Danna, based on Ahir Bhairav)

Notes

References

Discography references

Further reading 
 
 
 
 
 Authorised biography by

External links 

 Official Site 
 
 Pandit Jasraj Institute of Music, New York

1930 births
20th-century Indian male classical singers
Bhajan singers
2020 deaths
Mewati gharana
People from Hisar (city)
Rajasthani people
Recipients of the Kala Ratna
Recipients of the Padma Shri in arts
Recipients of the Padma Bhushan in arts
Recipients of the Padma Vibhushan in arts
Recipients of the Sangeet Natak Akademi Award
Recipients of the Sangeet Natak Akademi Fellowship
Singers from Haryana
Swarmandal players
Singers from Punjab, India
Tabla players
Indian Hindus
Indian music educators
21st-century Indian male classical singers